Shweta Konnur Menon (born 19 July 1979), known by her stage name Malavika, is an Indian actress who predominantly appears in Tamil films and a few Telugu, Kannada and Malayalam films.

Personal life
Malavika's birth name is Shweta Konnur. She was born to Aishwarya and Brigadier Jayvibhav Konnur in Bengaluru.

Malavika married Sumesh in March 2007. The couple have a son, born in 2008.

Career
Malavika shot to fame at the age of 19, with her debut in the 1999 Tamil movie Unnai Thedi with Ajith Kumar directed by Sundar C. The film went on to become a major blockbuster. She again was cast alongside Ajith in the film Anandha Poongatre. She showed her acting skills in the film Rojavanam, which established her as an actress and left her with three hits from three films. However, her fame was short lived as the film Pooparika Varugirom flopped, although the cast included Sivaji Ganesan. 

From 2000 to 2003 all her film failed at the box office except Vetri Kodi Kattu and Seenu. She returned with Suriya in Perazhagan in a song. In 2004, she starred alongside Kamal Haasan in Vasool Raja MBBS.  She was cast in the film Chandramukhi (2005). Later in that year, she ventured into Bollywood again and acted in C U at 9. She gave her best performance in the Tamil film Thiruttu Payale in 2006. She was also a part of Mani Ratnam's stage show, Netru Indru Naalai. In 2007, she appeared in supporting roles such as Vyapari, Thirumagan, Sabari, Manikanda  and Naan Avanillai. Since then, she has mostly seen in guest appearance roles in Kuruvi (2008), Aayudham Seivom (2008) and Aarupadai (2009).

In 2022, Malavika returned to the film industry nearly after a decade with the film Golmaal, directed by Pon Kumaran

Filmography

References

External links

Indian film actresses
1981 births
Living people
Actresses in Tamil cinema
Actresses from Bangalore
Actresses in Telugu cinema
21st-century Indian actresses
Actresses in Malayalam cinema
Actresses in Hindi cinema
Actresses in Kannada cinema